Dear Hank & John is a podcast hosted by the Green brothers: musician and author Hank Green and young-adult novelist John Green. The podcast is produced by Rosianna Halse Rojas and edited by Josef "Tuna" Metesh. First released in June 2015, Hank and John Green answer questions e-mailed by listeners, give "dubious" advice and talk about the weekly news from the planet Mars and the 4th tier English football club AFC Wimbledon. Episodes are typically around 45 minutes in length. Upon the podcast's debut, it reached the number 4 position on the US iTunes performance chart and hit a peak position of number 2 two days later. Dear Hank & John has also been charted on iTunes in the United Kingdom, Germany, France, Italy, Canada, Spain, Australia and Brazil. The podcast is primarily funded through the crowdfunding website Patreon, though the majority of the pledges go towards the video production budget of Complexly. From November 2018 to November 2020, the podcast was a co-production of Complexly and WNYC Studios. As of November 16, 2020, Dear Hank & John is once again an independently produced podcast.

Format 
Each podcast typically begins with an opening bit that changes approximately every two or three months. The main portion of the show then has the brothers offering advice, often comedic, to questions received from listeners. Usually, at some point in the question segment, the brothers plug various fictional sponsors of the show in a humorous manner that references topics from that week. The show then concludes with Hank delivering the news about Mars and John delivering the news about AFC Wimbledon football club, before reading the credits at the show's close.

Special episodes
In March 2017, a bonus supplemental podcast, titled This Week in Ryans, started to become available for those who support the podcast on Patreon. In each episode, a person or thing occasionally named Ryan is selected to be discussed and analyzed by the hosts in a short segment. In December 2019, the podcast was renamed to This Week in Worries. After the COVID-19 pandemic started in March 2020, the patreon podcast was renamed to This Week in Great Stuff.

An exclusive Dear Hank & John episode has been made as a perk for the annual Project for Awesome fundraising campaign each year since 2015.

During John's book tour for Turtles All the Way Down in late 2017, the Green brothers put on a two-hour performance of monologues, songs, and a live version of Dear Hank & John. This live production of their podcast included taking real questions from the audience. Segments that were recorded across the tour were later edited into a single podcast, and released as its 114th episode.

Merchandise 
The DFTBA store has produced a variety of merchandise based on the show, such as a bumper sticker that says "There is a diversity of opinions among the people who drive this car," which was in response to a listener's question about cars sporting political bumper stickers that not all people who drive that car might agree with, in episode 156.

List of episodes

Notes

References

External links 
 

2015 podcast debuts
Advice podcasts
Audio podcasts
Comedy and humor podcasts
Podcasts with educational YouTubers
Works by the Green brothers
Science podcasts
Sports podcasts
Patreon creators